Azam may refer to:

Given name
 Azam of Kalat, Khan of Kalat, Balochistan 1931–1933
 Azam Ali (born 1970), Iranian singer and musician
 Azam Ali (scientist) (active from 1988), Bangladeshi researcher into biomaterials
 Azam Azih (born 1995), Malaysian footballer
 Azam Cheema (born 1953), Indian terrorist
 Azam Farahi (born ), wife of Iranian former president Mahmoud Ahmadinejad
 Azam Farmonov (active from 2006), Uzbekistani rural development activist who was convicted for extortion
 Azam Ghauri (died 2000), Indian terrorist
 Azam Hussain (born 1985), Pakistani cricketer
 Azam Iqbal (born 1973), Bangladeshi cricketer
 Azam Jah (1907–1970), eldest son of the seventh and last Nizam of Hyderabad
 Azam Jah of the Carnatic (1797-1825), Nawab of the Carnatic region of India 1819–1825
 Azam Jan (born 1983), Pakistani cricketer
 Azam Khan (disambiguation), several people
 Azam Khodayari, Iranian athlete who competed at the 2004 Summer Paralympics
 Azam Radzhabov (born 1993), Belarusian footballer
 Azam Shah (1653–1707), Mughal emperor
 Azam Taleghani (1943–2019), Iranian politician and journalist
 Azam Tariq (disambiguation), several people

Middle given name
 Asif Azam Siddiqi (active from 2004), Bangladeshi-American space historian
 Fakhr Azam Wazir (active from 2013), Pakistani politician
 Hendra Azam Idris (born 1988), Bruneian international footballer
 Ghiyasuddin Azam Shah (reigned 1390–1411), third Sultan of Bengal
 Lila Azam Zanganeh (born 1986), French-Iranian writer
 Moavia Azam Tariq (active from 2018), Pakistani politician
 Mohd Badrul Azam Mohd Zamri (born 1984), Malaysian professional footballer
 Muhammed Azam Didamari (died 1765), Sufi Kashmiri writer in the Persian language
 Muhammad Farooq Azam Malik (active from 2018), Pakistani politician
 Parveen Azam Ali (born 1979), British nurse of Pakistani origin
 Sanwar Azam Sunny (born 1989), Bangladeshi artist, environmental activist and social entrepreneur
 Sardar Muhammad Azam Khan Musakhel (died 2018), Pakistani politician
 Shafiqul Azam Khan (born 1966), Bangladesh politician
 Sher Azam Khan (active from 2018), Pakistani politician
 Zahra Sadr-Azam Nouri (active from 1996), Iranian reformist politician

Surname
 Ali Azam (politician, born 1972), Bangladeshi MP
 Babar Azam (born 1994), Pakistani international cricketer
 Hammad Azam (born 1991), Pakistani cricketer
 Ahad Azam (born 1992), Israeli-Druze footballer
 Ahmad Ammar Ahmad Azam (1993–2013), moderate Islamic activist in Malaysia and Turkey
 Étienne Eugène Azam (1822–1899), French surgeon and psychologist
 Fakhrul Azam, Chief of the Air Staff of Bangladesh Air Force 2002-2007
 Farooq Azam (active from 1983), Pakistani marine microbiologist
 Haseeb Azam (born 1986), Pakistani cricketer
 Ghulam Azam (1922–2014), Bangladeshi politician
 Jan Azam (born 1924), Pakistani sports shooter who competed at the 1952 Summer Olympics
 Khurshid Azam (born 1942), Pakistani field hockey player who competed at the 1964 Summer Olympics
 Mian Muhammad Azam (born 1952), Pakistani politician
 Mir Azam (born 1978), Pakistani cricketer
 Mirza Azam (born 1962), Bangladeshi politician
 Mohammad Azam (born 1980), Emirati cricketer
 Mohammed Abdullah Azam (born 1970), British citizen convicted of terrorism offences
 Nasser Azam (born 1963), Pakistani-British artist
 Olivier Azam (born 1974), French rugby union footballer
 Rafiq Azam (born 1963), Bangladeshi architect
 Rahil Azam (born 1981), Indian model and television actor
 Rizwan Azam (born 1985), Pakistani male badminton player
 Saiful Azam (1941–2020), Pakistani/Bangladeshi air force officer
 Sarwar Azam (born 1952), Bangladeshi soldier, head of the Singranatore family
 Shehzad Azam (born 1985), Pakistani cricketer
 Zafar Azam (active from 2018), Pakistani politician

Other
 Azam F.C., an association football club in Dar es Salaam, Tanzania

See also
 Abu Azam, a village in Shoaybiyeh-ye Gharbi Rural District, Shadravan District, Shushtar County, Khuzestan Province, Iran
 Azam and Muazzam Khan's Tomb, Vasna, Ahmedabad, India
 Azam Basti, a neighbourhood of Jamshed Town in Karachi, Sindh, Pakistan
 Azam Jahi Mills, Warangal, a defunct Indian textile company in Hyderabad
 Azam mosque of Qom, Iran
 Azam Nagar, a village in Gujrat District, Punjab, Pakistan
 Azzam (disambiguation)
 Chowk Azam, a city in Layyah District, Punjab, Pakistan
 Ismul Azam, a name of Allah
 Jama Azam, a village in Jahanabad Rural District, in the Central District of Hirmand County, Sistan and Baluchestan Province, Iran
 Khushinan Azam, a village in Miyan Darband Rural District, in the Central District of Kermanshah County, Kermanshah Province, Iran
 Omm ol Azam, a village in Veys Rural District, Veys District, Bavi County, Khuzestan Province, Iran